Elgin Area School District U46, often referred to as "U-46", is a unit school district headquartered in Elgin, Kane County, Illinois. Covering , the district serves portions of eleven communities in the northwest suburbs of Chicago in Cook, DuPage and Kane Counties. School District U-46 serves over 40,000 children in grades preK-12. The district ranks as the second largest in Illinois with forty elementary schools, eight middle schools and five high schools.

Tony Sanders is the CEO as of August 2022.

Special programs
Center House
Central School Programs
DREAM Academy, an alternative school
High School Academy Program, a program for gifted students in High School
Preschool Programs
Radio station WEPS (88.9 FM)
School Within a School (SWAS) Program, a program for gifted students in 4th-8th Grade; also called Inquiry and Gifted Network for Ingenuity Talent and Exploration (IGNITE) Program
Planetarium/Observatory

Schools, alphabetically

See also

List of school districts in Illinois

References

 
School districts established in 1836
1836 establishments in Illinois